Solomon Hillen Jr. (July 10, 1810 – June 26, 1873) was a U.S. Representative from Maryland and mayor of Baltimore.

Early life
Solomon Hillen Jr. was born on July 10, 1810, at the family estate, "Hillendale," on Hillen Road north of Baltimore to Robina Kennedy (née McHaffle) and Thomas Hillen. He graduated from Georgetown College in 1827, studied law, was admitted to the bar, and commenced practice in Baltimore.

Career
Hillen served as member of the Maryland House of Delegates from 1834 to 1838. Hillen was elected as a Democrat to the Twenty-sixth Congress (March 4, 1839 – March 3, 1841). Afterward, he resumed the practice of law. He was elected on April 1, 1842 as Mayor of Baltimore, replacing Samuel Brady who had resigned. He was elected for a second term, but resigned in the fall of 1845, due to ill health. During his term, the Baltimore and Ohio Railroad was completed to Cumberland. He stopped practicing law due to ill health. He served in the company of the Independent Blues, and became colonel of the Fifth Regiment.

Personal life
Hillen married Emily O'Donnell, a daughter of General Columbus O'Donnell. Hillen had two children, Thomas Hillen (1849–1887) and Emily.

Hillen lived at "Palmyra", a house on Hillen Road opposite Woodbourne Avenue in Baltimore.

Hillen died on June 26, 1873, at Fifth Avenue Hotel in New York City. He is interred in Green Mount Cemetery in Baltimore.

Legacy
Hillen Street and Hillen Road in Baltimore were named after members of the Hillen family. Uses of "Hillendale" refer to the family's country estate.

References

External links

1810 births
1873 deaths
Democratic Party members of the Maryland House of Delegates
Mayors of Baltimore
Democratic Party members of the United States House of Representatives from Maryland
19th-century American politicians
Philodemic Society members
Maryland National Guard personnel
Burials at Green Mount Cemetery